Abortion in flowers and developing fruits is a common occurrence in plants.

An abortive flower is a flower that has a stamen but an under developed, or no pistil. It falls without producing fruit or seeds, due to its inability to fructify. Flowers require both male and female organs to reproduce, and the pistils and ovary serve as female organs, while the stamens are considered male organs. Illustrative examples include Urginea nagarjunae and Trichilogaster acaciaelongifoliae.

Studies have shown that hermaphrodites or bisexual flowers have higher rates of fruit abortions than unisexual flowers.

Causes of fruit & flower abortion 
Pollinated flowers and fruits can abort selectively. It could be because of the order of pollination, the number of developing seeds, pollen source, or some combination of these. Flowers and fruits can also abort because of outside causes like insufficient light, unsuitable photo-period, high temperature, nutrient deficiency, ethylene, drought stress.

Evidently, the abortion of fruits and flowers can also increase the fitness of a plant.

There is research to suggest that random selective abortions based on the timing of fertilization could increase the genetic quality of seeds. The age of the flower also has an effect on the percentage of abortion. The older the flower, the more likely it is to be aborting the fruit or pollen.

Plants have also been found to selectively abort seeds and fruit as a means of defense against herbivorous insects.
 Flower
 Stamen

References

Flowers
Plant anatomy
Plant reproduction